Defending champion Serena Williams defeated Vera Zvonareva in the final, 6–3, 6–2 to win the ladies' singles tennis title at the 2010 Wimbledon Championships. It was her fourth Wimbledon singles title and 13th major singles title overall. She did not lose a set during the tournament. Zvonareva reached her maiden major singles final, and became the second lowest-ranked woman to contest the final.

The reigning French Open champion Francesca Schiavone and runner-up Samantha Stosur both lost in the first round, marking the first time that the two French Open finalists lost in the opening round of Wimbledon.

The losses of Kim Clijsters and Venus Williams in the quarterfinals guaranteed a first time finalist from the bottom half of the draw. Petra Kvitová (ranked 62nd) and Tsvetana Pironkova (ranked 82nd), became the first time two unseeded players reached the semifinals since 1999. Pironkova became the first Bulgarian woman to reach the major semifinals for the first time in history. Additionally, Kaia Kanepi (ranked 80th) became the first qualifier to reach the quarterfinals since Séverine Beltrame in 2006.

Seeds

  Serena Williams (champion)
  Venus Williams (quarterfinals)
  Caroline Wozniacki (fourth round)
  Jelena Janković (fourth round, retired due to back injury)
  Francesca Schiavone (first round)
  Samantha Stosur (first round)
  Agnieszka Radwańska (fourth round)
  Kim Clijsters (quarterfinals)
  Li Na (quarterfinals)
  Flavia Pennetta (third round)
  Marion Bartoli (fourth round)
  Nadia Petrova (third round)
  Shahar Pe'er (second round)
  Victoria Azarenka (third round)
  Yanina Wickmayer (third round)
  Maria Sharapova (fourth round)
  Justine Henin (fourth round)

  Aravane Rezaï (second round)
  Svetlana Kuznetsova (second round)
  Dinara Safina (withdrew)
  Vera Zvonareva (final)
  María José Martínez Sánchez (withdrew)
  Zheng Jie (second round)
  Daniela Hantuchová (second round)
  Lucie Šafářová (first round)
  Alisa Kleybanova (third round)
  Maria Kirilenko (third round)
  Alona Bondarenko (third round)
  Anastasia Pavlyuchenkova (third round)
  Yaroslava Shvedova (second round)
  Alexandra Dulgheru (third round)
  Sara Errani (third round)
  Melanie Oudin (second round)
  Kateryna Bondarenko (first round)

Dinara Safina and María José Martínez Sánchez withdrew due to injury; Safina with a lower back injury and Martínez Sánchez with a knee injury. They were replaced in the draw by the highest-ranked non-seeded players Melanie Oudin and Kateryna Bondarenko, who became the #33 and #34 seeds.

Qualifying

Draw

Finals

Top half

Section 1

Section 2

Section 3

Section 4

Bottom half

Section 5

Section 6

Section 7

Section 8

Championship match statistics

Notes

References

External links

2010 Wimbledon Championships on WTAtennis.com
2010 Wimbledon Championships – Women's draws and results at the International Tennis Federation

Women's Singles
Wimbledon Championship by year – Women's singles
Wimbledon Championships
Wimbledon Championships